Lee Ji-han (born 8 January 2003) is a South Korean professional footballer who plays as a forward for SC Freiburg II.

Career statistics

References

2003 births
Living people
South Korean footballers
Association football forwards
3. Liga players
SC Freiburg players
SC Freiburg II players
South Korean expatriate footballers
South Korean expatriate sportspeople in Germany
Expatriate footballers in Germany